Leo Frank Corbet Jr. (November 16, 1936 – December 22, 2019) was an American lawyer and politician.

Corbet was born in Lordsburg, New Mexico and graduated from Yuma High School in Yuma, Arizona. He received his bachelor's and law degrees from University of Arizona. Corbet then practiced law in Phoenix, Arizona. Corbet served in the Arizona Senate from 1971 to 1983 and from 1989 to 1991. He was a Republican. In 2001, Corbet underwent heart transplant surgery. Corbet died in Phoenix, Arizona.

Notes

1936 births
2019 deaths
People from Hidalgo County, New Mexico
Lawyers from Phoenix, Arizona
Politicians from Phoenix, Arizona
University of Arizona alumni
Republican Party Arizona state senators
Heart transplant recipients
20th-century American lawyers